Where We Are is the ninth studio album by Irish boy band Westlife. It was released on 27 November 2009 in Ireland and on 30 November 2009 in the UK through S Records, RCA Records and Sony Music, the band's tenth album under them. Where We Are is the group's first album following a break from music in 2008. It was also the band's fifth album to be released as a four-piece. This album was preceded by the lead single "What About Now" (a cover of the Daughtry song) and it was released on 23 October 2009 as a digital download a day later as a CD single.

The group collaborated with numerous notable producers for the album, notably Ryan Tedder of the pop rock band OneRepublic, Jim Jonsin, Greg Wells and Sam Watters, among others. Where We Are is also notably the first Westlife album not to have Steve Mac and Wayne Hector produce or write any of the songs.

The album was met with mixed reviews, although it was still commercially successful, debuting at number two at the UK Albums Chart and got 2× Platinum Certification in the United Kingdom which sold more than 600 000 records. Despite the high peak, it was the first Westlife album not to peak at number one since their 2004 album Allow Us to Be Frank peaked at number three. This is the 7th top-selling album of 2009 in Ireland.

Background
Before Christmas 2008, they wrote a letter to their website saying that 2009 was going to be the most exciting year yet for Westlife. The recording process of their tenth album started on 1 July 2009. Byrne said that there will be many first-time producers and writers for the upcoming album. He also wanted to have collaboration works with Chris Martin of Coldplay who happens to be a big Westlife fan. Westlife worked with JC Chasez, Darren Hayes, Ben Adams, Adrian Bradford, and Guy Chambers for the album but all did not make the cut.

Filan talks about the content of the album and stated: A different direction might be a bit wrong. I think it's still pop music, but there's a different variation on it. One massive thing is we worked with different producers, who we've never worked with before, and new song writers. There are thirteen songs on the album and twelve of them are originals. There's more tempo, more rocky songs, some more American songs, some darker songs on there with darker lyrics. It's the best production we've had on any other album. The strings, the music is just on another level. Even if you're not a Westlife fan but you're a music fan, you will recognise the quality on this album.

On their new biography posted on their official website, it has been added that the recording sessions began in LA, with a completely fresh team of producers and songwriters. The first song they recorded was the ballad, "I’ll See You Again", described as "haunting bereavement". "I'll See You Again" was recorded by Ross at Metropolis Studios. For their first single "What About Now" Feehily told The Daily Mirror, "We wanted the first single from our new album to be somewhere between the Westlife sound our fans know and love, and the new direction we're heading in. We've been experimenting with a fresh vibe on this record. After 11 years we see this as phase two of the Westlife story." The song "Shadows" which has been confirmed to be included on the album was written by Ryan Tedder and AJ McLean for the Backstreet Boys' seventh album This Is Us but was not selected for inclusion. It was subsequently purchased by record label boss Simon Cowell for Leona Lewis's second album Echo but it was later decided that the song was more suited to a boyband and thus given Westlife to record.

The album also contains an "in memory of" section to Nikky Byrne and Kevin Egan, the fathers of Westlife members Nicky Byrne and Kian Egan. The last song from the standard track listing of the album, "I'll See You Again", was included in the concert tour set list of the album. The song is established as the tribute song to their deceased fathers by putting their pictures at the background of the stage each time they performed it. The song is also the band's twelfth most streamed song in the United Kingdom as of January 2019.

Promotion
On 25 October 2009, during the X Factor results show, Westlife performed "What About Now". It was released online the same day. On 26 October they performed on GMTV and were interviewed in addition to hosting a webchat, with a further interview on The One Show on 30 October 2009. They will also perform at BBC Children in Need on 20 November and be interviewed on 26 November and 4 December on Alan Carr's Chatty Man and The Friday Show respectively. They are also doing radio promos in major cities of UK and Ireland from 24 October–November including an interview on BBC Radio One. TV dates were announced later. Following a Swedish promotional tour with performance on Swedish Idol. On 27 November 2009, Westlife performed on infamous UK television shows like Paul O' Grady Show and The Late Late Toy Show.

On 1 February 2010, their official website was revised. They called it as a first phase of 2010 assault. On 10 February 2010, they are invited to Jonathan Ross show for an interview to be televised on 12 February 2010. First week of February, they embarked on a promotional tour of Germany and guested on the Oliver Pocher Show on the third week of February.

"How to Break a Heart" was released as a promotional single on 10 March 2010 in some countries. They got the chance to perform with Boyzone for a track on the Stephen Gately Show in Ireland. They were invited to perform on Sun City Super Bowl Show on South Africa to be held on 19 March and Fashion Kicks 2010 on 13 April.

Supporting tour

Critical reception

Where We Are received mostly unfavorable reviews, with most reviewers criticizing the album's similar music style, as well as the fact that there is little difference from their previous material.

Robert Spellman of Daily Express gave the album two stars out of five, saying that "all the songs sound alike and deal with heartbreak." Lauren Murphy of Entertainment Ireland gave a similar score, stating that "as maudlin and one-dimensional as any of their recent material", although she praised Feehily's vocals. Rick Pearson of London Evening Standard called the album's songs "bland" and "uninspiring", concluding that "Where We Are finds Westlife exactly where they were at the beginning of the decade." Ben Chalk of MSN UK stated that the album is "aimed squarely at the sort of person who buys one album a year, usually at Christmas, to listen to in the car." Hugh Montgomery of The Observer criticized the album's "usual...over-production, ersatz yearning and (anti-)climactic key changes." Alex Fletcher of Digital Spy panned Where We Are, saying that "there isn't a drop of passion, genuine emotion or soul to be found anywhere." Ian Gittins of Virgin Media gave the album one star out of five, saying that "The only emotion...is a sinking sense of déjà vu."

Jason Birchmeier of AllMusic and Rovi Music gave the album three and a half stars out of five, noting the group's usual musical structure, although he praised the album for containing "many first-rate songs...and the production is polished to perfection." Mike Diver of BBC Music gave Where We Are a favorable review, referring to many "surprises" contained within the album, although he notes that "their style has barely changed."

Track listing

Notes
  signifies an additional producer
 "Leaving" is also referred to as "You're Leaving".
 "The Difference" is also referred to as "Difference".
 "Reach Out" is also referred to as "Reach Out for Me" and "Sanctuary - Cues" according to the ACE ASCAP repertoire.
 "I'll See You Again" is also referred to as "Could Be Already" according to the ACE ASCAP repertoire.
 "What About Now" was not included on the Czech and Slovak track listing.

Charts

Weekly charts

Year-end charts

Certifications

Release history

Credits 

Vanessa Addo-Yeboah -	Vocals
Ian Agate	- Engineer
Joel Anderson -	Cover Photo
Steve Anderson -	Arranger, Engineer, Mixing, Producer, String Arrangements
David Angell -	Violin
Jesse Astin -	Egg Shaker
Paul Beard -	Piano
Louis Biancaniello -	Composer, Engineer, Guitar, Keyboards, Producer, Programming
Chris Blade -	Arranger, Producer
Steve Booker -	Bass, Composer, Keyboards, Producer, Programming
Jeff Bova -	String Arrangements, Strings
Chris Braide -	Composer, Producer
Karl Brazil -	Drums
John Catchings	- Cello
Nikolaj Juel Christiansen -	Guitar
Bryan Christopher -	Composer
Bryn Christopher -	Producer
Scott Cutler -	Composer, Egg Shaker, Guitar, Producer, Programming
David Davidson -	Orchestration, String Transcription, Violin
Sophie Delila -	Composer, Piano, Producer
Alessandro Destefanis -	Assistant
Althea Edwards -	Vocals
Carl Falk -	Composer, Producer
Mark Feehily -	Composer, Producer, Vocals
Richard Flack -	Engineer
John Garrison -	Bass
Dyre Gormsen -	Engineer
Simon Hale -	Arranger, Strings
Joshua Hartzler -	Composer
Heard But Not Seen Choir -	Choir, Chorus
Andy Hill -	Additional Production, Producer
Iain Hill -	Engineer
David Hodges -	Composer
Christian Howes -	Strings
Henrik Janson -	String Arrangements
Candace Johnson -	Vocals
Lawrence Johnson -	Vocal Arrangement
Bryon Jones -	Vocals
Priscilla Jones -	Vocals
Jim Jonsin -	Keyboards, Producer, Programming
Jon Kelly -	Engineer
Brian Kennedy -	Guitar, Producer, Programming
Emanuel Kiriakou -	Composer, Engineer, Instrumentation, Producer, Programming
Savan Kotecha -	Composer, Producer
Larossi -	Additional Production, Engineer
Josef Larossi -	Instrumentation, Programming
Damien Lewis -	Engineer
Shaznay Lewis -	Composer, Producer
Peter Ljung -	Piano
The London Session Orchestra -	Strings
The Love Sponge Strings -	Strings

Will Malone -	Keyboards, Programming, String Arrangements, Synthesizer
Rob Marks -	Engineer
Subrina McCalla -	Vocals
Kevin McDaid -	Photography
Alexander McLean -	Composer, Producer
Vlado Meller -	Mastering
Millennia Strings -	Strings
Candice Mimi-Appiah -	Vocals
Ben Moody -	Composer
Esbjörn Öhrwall -	Guitar
Steven Lee Olsen -	Composer, Producer
Andreas Olsson -	Keyboards, Programming
Ross 'Dights' Parkin -	Engineer
John Parricelli -	Guitar
Doug Petty -	Bass, Drum Programming, Guitar (Acoustic), Guitar (Electric), Keyboards, *Percussion, Piano
Simon Petty -	Composer, Guitar (Acoustic), Producer
Ian Pitter -	Vocals
Shelly Poole -	Producer
Luke Potashnick -	Guitar
Anne Preven -	Composer, Producer
Quiz -	Engineer, Mixing
Quiz -	Additional Production
Zac Rae -	Guitar, Programming
Conner Reeves -	Composer, Producer
John Reid -	Composer
Jon Reid -	Producer
Carol Riley -	Vocals
Lindy Robbins -	Composer, Producer
Steve Robson -	Producer
Andreas "Quiz" Romdhane -	Instrumentation, Programming
Jeff Rothschild -	Mixing
Mark Santangelo -	Assistant
James Scheffer -	Composer, Producer
Brian Kennedy Seals -	Composer
Edward Shearmur -	Strings
Bobby Shin -	Strings
Jonathan Shorten -	Composer, Producer
Kristoffer Sonne -	Drums
Steve Stacey -	Design
Xavier Stephenson -	Assistant
Stockholm Session Strings -	Strings
Phil Tan -	Mixing
Ryan Tedder -	Arranger, Composer, Engineer, Guitar, Piano, Producer, Programming, Strings
Martin Terefe -	Bass, Producer
Pat Thrall -	Editing
Nikolaj Torplarsen -	Arranger, Keyboards, Piano
Luke Tozour -	Engineer
Neil Tucker -	Engineer
Sam Watters -	Composer, Engineer, Producer
Greg Wells -	Instrumentation, Producer
Jeremy Wheatley - Mixing, String Arrangements
Wayne Wilkins	- Composer, Keyboards, Producer, Programming
Kris Wilkinson	- Viola, Violin
Neal Wilkinson	- Drums
Noel Zancanella - Engineer

Source: Allmusic.com

References

Westlife albums
2009 albums
Albums produced by Brian Kennedy (record producer)
Albums produced by Steve Robson
Albums produced by Jim Jonsin
Albums produced by Greg Wells
Albums produced by Ryan Tedder
Albums produced by Emanuel Kiriakou
Sony Music albums
RCA Records albums